Joseph Schildkraut Presents is an anthology television series that originally aired on the DuMont Television Network starring stage and screen actor Joseph Schildkraut.

Broadcast history
The series aired from October 28, 1953, to January 21, 1954. The series originally aired Wednesdays at 8:30pm ET, and moved to Thursdays at 8pm ET for the last three airdates, January 7, 14, and 21. The original contract with DuMont called for 26 episodes, with Schildkraut hosting all 26, and acting in 14 episodes. The series was cancelled after 13 episodes had aired.

This series is often confused with Personal Appearance Theatre which aired on ABC in the 1951–52 season and on which Schildkraut was also featured. The UCLA Film and Television Archive has some episodes of this earlier series.

Episode status
The UCLA Film and Television Archive lists seven episodes in its collection. However, only one (November 18, 1953) is from the DuMont series. The others are from the earlier ABC series Personal Appearance Theatre (1951–52), which also starred Schildkraut, and which may have also aired on DuMont stations.

See also
List of programs broadcast by the DuMont Television Network
List of surviving DuMont Television Network broadcasts
1953-54 United States network television schedule

References

Bibliography
David Weinstein, The Forgotten Network: DuMont and the Birth of American Television (Philadelphia: Temple University Press, 2004) 
Alex McNeil, Total Television, Fourth edition (New York: Penguin Books, 1980) 
Tim Brooks and Earle Marsh, The Complete Directory to Prime Time Network TV Shows, Third edition (New York: Ballantine Books, 1964)

External links
Joseph Schildkraut Presents at IMDb
Joseph Schildkraut Presents at CTVA
Personal Appearance Theatre at IMDb
DuMont historical website

DuMont Television Network original programming
1953 American television series debuts
1954 American television series endings
1950s American anthology television series
Black-and-white American television shows